The Keppel Union School District is a school district that serves the far eastern parts of the city of Palmdale, California, USA, and its immediate suburbs including Littlerock, Pearblossom, Sun Village, Llano, and Lake Los Angeles.

The Keppel Union School District has approximately 3,100 students enrolled in 6 schools:
 5 elementary schools
 1 junior high school
 1 Alternative school

The Keppel Union School District is only serving kindergarten through the 8th grade. All high school level education (9th - 12th grades) in the metropolitan area is provided by the Antelope Valley Union High School District.

List of schools

Elementary Schools 
Alpine Elementary School (K through 8th grade)
Antelope Elementary School (K through 8th grade)
Gibson Elementary School (K through 8th grade)
[www.keppel.k12.ca.us/schools/lake-los-angeles/ Lake Los Angeles School] (K through 8th grade)
Pearblossom Elementary School (K through 8th grade)

As of the 2011-2012 school year (starting August 8, 2011), each of the above elementary schools expanded into the eighth grade so that each Keppel Elementary School campus will include kindergarten to the eighth grade (K through 8th grade).

Junior high school
Keppel Academy (5th, 6th, 7th, & 8th grade)
Keppel Academy operated under the name of Almondale Middle School when it was built in 1959 to July 1, 2010 when the Keppel Union School District board members renamed the campus, Keppel Academy. Keppel Academy added 5th grade to its campus in the 2013-2014 school year after three school years of only having three grade levels (6th through 8th).

Alternate Schools
Desert View Community Day School (K-8th grade)

See also
List of school districts in California
Palmdale School District
Westside Union School District

References

External links
 

Education in Palmdale, California
School districts in Los Angeles County, California